Uwe Kamps (born 12 June 1964) is a German retired footballer who played as a goalkeeper.

Club career
Born in Düsseldorf, Kamps joined Borussia Mönchengladbach from amateur club BV 04 Düsseldorf. On 12 March 1983 he made his debut with the first team, starting in a 3–0 home win against Arminia Bielefeld, and finished his debut season in the Bundesliga with 12 games and 20 goals conceded, including four in the final round, a 6–4 success at Borussia Dortmund.

After three additional campaigns with only three matches combined, Kamps became the side's undisputed starter, going on to amass 390 top division games. In 1991–92 he lost the German Cup final to Hannover 96, after a legendary semifinal against Bayer 04 Leverkusen where he saved all four penalties from the opposition (Martin Kree, Ioan Lupescu, Heiko Herrlich and Jorginho); he would start and win the same competition in 1995, after a 3–0 final win over VfL Wolfsburg.

Kamps remained in Borussia's books until the end of 2003–04. He was influential in its 2001 return to the top level after two years of absence, appearing in 67 out of 68 matches in the second division over the two years. However, the signing of Swiss international Jörg Stiel relegated him to the bench for the following three seasons, with his only appearance coming when he was brought on as a substitute on the occasion of the club's final league match at the Bökelbergstadion in May 2004. It was his 390th Bundesliga appearance.

Subsequently, Kamps continued working with his only club, as a goalkeeper coach.

Honours

Club
DFB-Pokal: 1994–95; Runner-up 1983–84, 1991–92

Country
Summer Olympic Games: Bronze medal 1988

See also
List of one-club men

References

External links

1964 births
Living people
Footballers from Düsseldorf
German footballers
Association football goalkeepers
Bundesliga players
2. Bundesliga players
Borussia Mönchengladbach players
Olympic footballers of West Germany
West German footballers
Olympic bronze medalists for West Germany
Footballers at the 1988 Summer Olympics
Olympic medalists in football
Medalists at the 1988 Summer Olympics
Borussia Mönchengladbach non-playing staff
Association football goalkeeping coaches